Jari Kaarela (born 8 August 1958 in Tampere, Finland) is a retired Finnish professional ice hockey player who played in the National Hockey League and SM-liiga. He played five games with the Colorado Rockies during the 1980–81 season and then two seasons with for HIFK of the SM-liiga between 1984 and 1986.

Career statistics

Regular season and playoffs

External links
 

1958 births
Finnish ice hockey goaltenders
Colorado Rockies (NHL) players
Fort Worth Texans players
HIFK (ice hockey) players
Ice hockey people from Tampere
Indianapolis Checkers players
Living people
Muskegon Mohawks players
Oulun Kärpät players
SaPKo players
Undrafted National Hockey League players